Charles Lynn Batten (born 1942) is an American literary critic and a professor in the department of English at the University of California, Los Angeles. He has won numerous teaching awards throughout his career at UCLA, including the Distinguished Teaching Award in 1981. ,

Publications
 Pleasurable Instruction: Form and Convention in Eighteenth Century Travel Literature, 1978.

References

External links
 Official website
Bibliography of travel literature
 Voyeurism and Aesthetics in the Turkish Bath:Lady Mary's School of Female Beauty - Project MUSE

British literature
University of California, Los Angeles faculty
Living people
1942 births